The Treason Act 1702 (1 Anne Stat. 2 c. 21) is an Act of the Parliament of England, passed to enforce the line of succession to the English throne (today the British throne), previously established by the Bill of Rights 1689 and the Act of Settlement 1701.

The Act makes it treason to "endeavour to deprive or hinder any person who shall be the next in succession to the crown for the time being ... from succeeding after the decease of her Majesty (whom God long preserve) to the imperial crown of this realm and the dominions and territories thereunto belonging".

Originally a capital offence, the penalty was reduced in 1998 to life imprisonment.

Although the Act was passed by the English Parliament, it was later extended to Scotland by the Treason Act 1708, following the Union of the two kingdoms in the previous year. The Parliament of Ireland passed a law to the same effect in 1703, the Treason Act (Ireland) 1703 (c.5). This is still in force in Northern Ireland.

In fiction
 In the movie King Ralph, Ralph used the Treason Act of 1702 as his justification in ordering the arrest of Lord Graves (John Hurt) on the grounds that Graves had interfered with Ralph's succession to the throne. After silently going through the Mnemonic Verse, he mentioned it was passed by William III, when in fact it was passed in the first year of Queen Anne's reign.
 In the movie Johnny English, the "jumped-up Frenchman" Pascal Sauvage (John Malkovich) is tried for treason under this Act when his plot to seize the throne is foiled, and the audience is told that the crime still carries a penalty of death by hanging. However, as the film was released in 2003 (the penalty was downgraded to life imprisonment in 1998), it renders the imposition of the death penalty inaccurate.

See also
High treason in the United Kingdom
Succession to the Crown Act 1707
Treason Act

References

External links
Official text of the Act 1 Anne Stat. 2 1702 as in force today (including any amendments) within the United Kingdom, from the UK Statute Law Database
Official text of the Treason Act (Ireland) 1703 as in force today (including any amendments) within the United Kingdom, from the UK Statute Law Database

1702 in law
1702 in England
Acts of the Parliament of England
Acts of the Parliament of England still in force
English monarchy
English criminal law
Treason in England